Archie Johnson is a fictional character from the CBS crime drama CSI: Crime Scene Investigation, portrayed by Archie Kao. He first appeared in the second season episode "Caged", broadcast on November 8, 2001. Archie is the lab's audiovisual technician. Kao originally made a guest appearance in one episode, before he was asked to return in the recurring role of Archie by the show's executive producer Jerry Bruckheimer. Kao made his last appearance as Archie in the twelfth season episode "Split Decisions", which aired on April 4, 2012.

Casting
Actor Archie Kao was originally offered a guest appearance in one episode of CSI: Crime Scene Investigation. When the show's executive producer, Jerry Bruckheimer saw the episode, he told Kao's agent that he wanted him to play a recurring character on the show. Kao told Frank Mustac from the Fairfax Times that he was "stunned" to learn that Bruckheimer wanted him back and said the show had given him a renewed confidence. Kao stated that his character was not named after him and it was just a coincidence they shared the same first name. Kao felt lucky to be cast in the show due to Asian actors having "severely limited roles" to play on television. From his introduction in the show's second season, Kao appeared in every season until his departure in 2012.

Kao explained that his character's job as an Audiovisual technician was not "as technical" as some of the other characters' jobs and what they have to deal with. He also stated "[Archie Johnson is] kind of a techie geek. He has a girlfriend. He drives a Harley and he likes Star Trek."

Storylines
Archie works at the lab as an audiovisual technician, assisting the other CSIs in their cases. During an investigation at a computer-based business, Archie works out in the field, which he enjoys. Archie is revealed to be a fan of Star Trek and internet-based role-playing games. While assisting Warrick Brown (Gary Dourdan) in a case involving an apparent death by heat stroke, Archie says that he would like to die in his sleep by an aneurysm. Along with the other lab technicians, Wendy (Liz Vassey), Henry (Jon Wellner) and Mandy (Sheeri Rappaport), Archie tries to help David Hodges (Wallace Langham) figure out who The Miniature Killer is.

Archie later takes over the role of handwriting analysis, saying he wants to expand his horizons and his pay check. Raymond Langston (Laurence Fishburne) befriends Archie and notes that he has bought one of his books. Archie also compliments Raymond's use of Mandarin Chinese, showing that Archie is of Chinese descent. Archie is sent undercover at a hotel along with Greg Sanders (Eric Szmanda), Catherine Willows (Marg Helgenberger) and Detective Vartann (Alex Carter). There he installs a series of cameras, along with Greg, for a stakeout. When Archie is leaving the hotel, he trips on the stairs and falls, coming face to face with the body of a woman. Archie is visibly shaken at his discovery.

Reception
Lyle Masaki from TheBacklot.com praised Kao, saying "Kao was one of my reasons for watching CSI – until I realized he was horribly underused."

References

External links

CSI: Crime Scene Investigation characters
Fictional Chinese American people
Fictional forensic scientists
Television characters introduced in 2001